Neaethus grossus is a species of tropiduchid planthopper in the family Tropiduchidae. It is found in North America.

Subspecies
These two subspecies belong to the species Neaethus grossus:
 Neaethus grossus grossus Melichar, 1906
 Neaethus grossus pallidus Melichar, 1906

References

Articles created by Qbugbot
Insects described in 1906
Gaetuliini